Tendai Chisoro (born 12 February 1988) is a Zimbabwean cricketer who represents the Zimbabwe national cricket team. He made his international debut for Zimbabwe in October 2015.

Domestic career
Chisoro was the leading wicket-taker in the 2017–18 Logan Cup for Mid West Rhinos, with 28 dismissals in five matches. He was also the leading wicket-taker for Mid West Rhinos in the 2017–18 Pro50 Championship tournament, with twelve dismissals in eight matches. In December 2020, he was selected to play for the Southern Rocks in the 2020–21 Logan Cup.

In 20222, Chisoro signed with St Patricks Cricket Club in Cricket Albury Wodonga and has fatly become one of the most renowned names in regional cricket across Australia.

International career
Chisoro made his One Day International (ODI) debut for Zimbabwe against Afghanistan on 16 October 2015. He made his Twenty20 International debut, also against Afghanistan, on 26 October 2015. Along with Sikandar Raza, they set the highest ninth-wicket partnership for Zimbabwe in ODIs, with 91 not out.

In October 2017, Chisoro was named in Zimbabwe's Test squad for their series against the West Indies. He made his Test debut for Zimbabwe against the West Indies on 29 October 2017.

In June 2018, Chisoro was named in a Zimbabwe Select team for warm-up fixtures ahead of the 2018 Zimbabwe Tri-Nation Series.

References

External links
 

1988 births
Living people
Zimbabwean cricketers
Zimbabwe Test cricketers
Zimbabwe One Day International cricketers
Zimbabwe Twenty20 International cricketers
Centrals cricketers
Masvingo cricketers
Southern Rocks cricketers
Mid West Rhinos cricketers
Sportspeople from Masvingo